Hypocala deflorata is a moth of the family Erebidae. It was first described by Johan Christian Fabricius in 1794. It is widespread from India, Sri Lanka to Africa and to Australia and many Pacific islands. Records include China, Borneo, Queensland, Vanuatu, New Caledonia, Rotuma, Fiji, Samoa, Hawaii, Norfolk Island and New Zealand.

Description
Full-grown larvae are about 45 mm. There is a green and a black form, as well as an intermediate form with a mostly black head, and much blackish mottling on the dorsal part.

The pupa is about 22 mm in length and is medium dark brown. Pupation takes place in a cell in the soil, or beneath trash on the surface. The cell is supplied with a few fibers of silk. The pupal period is 13–17 days.

In the adult, the head, thorax and forewings are pale violaceous grey. Hindwings with large orange area. Marginal black area reduced and the two orange spots conjoined. Ventral side black on forewing reduced to two bars, and that on hindwing also much reduced.

Ecology
The larvae feed on Diospyros pallens, Diospyros villosa, Diospyros dichrophylla, Diospyros lycioides, Maba sandwicensis, Royena and Sapota species.

Subspecies
Hypocala deflorata deflorata
Hypocala deflorata australiae (Queensland, Vanuatu, New Caledonia, Rotuma, Fiji, Samoa, Norfolk Island, New Zealand)

References

External links

Hypocalinae
Insects of the Democratic Republic of the Congo
Insects of West Africa
Insects of Uganda
Moths of Asia
Moths of Japan
Insects of Tanzania
Moths of New Zealand
Moths of Africa